The first election to the Aberdare Urban District Council was held in December 1894.  It was followed by the 1896 election. 

There were five wards, namely Aberaman (also known as No. 5 Ward), Blaengwawr (also known as No. 4 Ward), Gadlys (also known as No. 2 Ward), Llwydcoed (also known as No. 1 Ward), and the Town Ward (also known as No. 3 Ward). Three members were elected from each ward making a total of fifteen members on the authority. In subsequent elections a third of the council would be elected each year. Therefore, the members returned at the head of the poll would serve until 1898, those in second place until 1897 and those in third place until 1896. Rhys Hopkin Rhys, chair of the previous Local Board of Health became the first chairman of the Urban District Council.

Aberaman Ward

Blaengwawr Ward

Gadlys Ward

Llwydcoed Ward

Town Ward

References

1894
1894 Welsh local elections
December 1894 events